The 1992–93 Cymru Alliance was the third season of the Cymru Alliance after its establishment in 1990. The league was won by Llansantffraid.

League table

References

External links
Cymru Alliance

Cymru Alliance seasons
2
Wales